Mouritz Botha (born 29 January 1982) is a former rugby union player who played for the Saracens and Newcastle Falcons in the Aviva Premiership. He joined English club Bedford Blues in 2006 and made 73 appearances before moving to Saracens in 2009. Botha was named in the 2011 England Saxons squad for the Churchill Cup after qualifying for England on residency grounds. He was forced to retire on the 30th of September 2017, on medical advice related to concussion.

Bedford Blues
Botha joined Bedford Blues from Bedford Athletic in 2006 and was a mainstay in the team. Botha was selected for an East Midlands team that played in a match against the Barbarians. His performances got the attention of the incoming Saracens head coach Brendan Venter and he was signed for Saracens in 2009.

Saracens
Botha was signed for Saracens in the summer of 2009 from the National League 1 team the Bedford Blues. He made his debut on 5 September 2009 in the London Double Header against London Irish. He came on as a substitute in the 60th minute for fellow Saracens lock Hugh Vyvyan. Mouritz was a success in his first season for Saracens and quickly became a fans' favourite. The season ended in an appearance in the Guinness Premiership Final for Saracens. He again came on as a substitute in this game. He made a total of 32 appearances in the 2009–2010 season, scoring one try.

Botha played a vital role in helping Saracens to win the 2010–11 English Premiership. Along the way, he made 27 appearances and was named in the 2011 Sky Sports Dream Team. He was subsequently selected in the full England squad and made his debut against .

In Botha's third season for Saracens, he was a frequent starter and helping them to finish in the semi-final places of the 2011–12 English Premiership, before losing to Leicester Tigers in the semi-final. In total, he made 24 appearances for Saracens scoring one try.

During the season, Botha made his 100th appearance for the club in the 40–7 win over Edinburgh, helping Saracens to win their Heineken Cup pool and giving them a home quarter final draw against Ulster. Botha also started in the first ever Aviva Premiership match to be played at Saracens' new ground Allianz Park, in a 31–11 victory over Exeter Chiefs. Botha came off of the bench as a second-half substitute for Alistair Hargreaves to help Saracens to a 27–16 victory over Ulster in the quarter final of the Heineken Cup setting up a semi final with Toulon at Twickenham. So far in the season, Botha has made 24 appearances for Saracens, scoring 1 try.

Sharks
He made eleven appearances for the Sharks in the Super Rugby season, but could not prevent them having a disappointing season, missing out on the finals series by finishing fourth in the South African Conference and 11th on the overall log.

Newcastle Falcons

International career
Although he was born in South Africa, Botha qualified for England on residency grounds, having moved to England in 2004. Botha impressed with his performances for Saracens on the way to them becoming the Aviva Premiership champions and this led to him being named in the 2011 England Saxons squad for the Churchill Cup.

Botha played in every game of England's 2012 Six Nations campaign, ultimately helping them to a second-place finish. At the end of 2012, Botha was named in the England squad for their tour of South Africa. Returning to his homeland, he started in England's 22–17 loss to South Africa. He later started in the second test and came on as a substitute in the 14–14 draw with South Africa in the last test.

References

External links
 Saracens profile
 England Profile
 A series of photographs on Flickr

South African rugby union players
Living people
1982 births
England international rugby union players
Bedford Blues players
Newcastle Falcons players
Saracens F.C. players
Rugby union players from KwaZulu-Natal